Erwin Poensgen (1882-1966), who was not a member of the Nazi Party, was the Ambassador of Nazi Germany to Venezuela from 1937 until 1941.

References

1882 births
1966 deaths
Ambassadors of Germany to Venezuela